Apuania was a short-lived comune of the Kingdom of Italy, created in 1938 under the Fascist regime by merging the Tuscan cities of Massa and Carrara and the smaller town of Montignoso. The province of Massa-Carrara was accordingly renamed province of Apuania. Among the main supporters of this unified municipality were Fascist leaders Renato Ricci, from Carrara, and Osvaldo Sebastiani, from Massa. Apuania had an area of 181 square kilometres and population of 106,378 inhabitants (59,031 in Carrara, 41,819 in Massa, 5,528 in Montignoso), making up for over half of its province's overall population of 204,377; its motto was Ex tribus una (Latin: "From three, one"). The administrative seat was located in Carrara, the largest of the three merged towns. The municipality of Apuania was dissolved in 1946, after which Massa, Carrara and Montignoso were re-established as separate municipalities.

References

Former municipalities of Tuscany